Live at the Palomino, 1983 is a live album by American country rock band Lone Justice, released in 2019 by Omnivore Recordings. It was recorded in October 1983 at the Palomino Club in Los Angeles by an early Lone Justice lineup consisting of Maria McKee, Ryan Hedgecock, Marvin Etzioni and Don Willens. The live album features songs from their yet to be recorded debut album, 1985's Lone Justice, coupled with classic country covers, and songs which, years later, have appeared in demo form on various compilation albums. The two-track live recording was discovered more than 30 years later by Hedgecock and issued with full cooperation from the band.

Critical reception

In his review for All About Jazz, Doug Collette saw the band as one of the originators of the cowpunk movement in the 1980s, "infusing roots music with a punk attitude while still maintaining the legitimacy of both genres." He felt that the band "bristles with an energy and sense of purpose bordering on missionary zeal." Collette concluded that "injecting a palpable sense of irreverence into songs like "Drugstore Cowboy," the band avoids the sanctimonious solemnity of peers and successors."

Peter Lindblad of Elmore Magazine described the band's performance as "inspired, daring and reckless", writing that "every song goes off like a lit pack of firecrackers in a hot, stuffy room." He called the two-track recording "imperfect" and "a little dusty and dirty", containing "a closeness that is inescapable, almost claustrophobic."

Track listing
Adapted from the album's liner notes.

Personnel 
Adapted from the album's liner notes.

Lone Justice
Maria McKee – guitar, vocals 
Ryan Hedgecock – guitar, vocals
Marvin Etzioni – bass, vocals
Don Willens – drums

Production
Marvin Etzioni – producer, album assembly, album sequencing, liner notes
Adam Pike – post production
Bernie Grundman – tape transfer, mastering
Gary Leonard – cover photography, handwritten type
Ryan's Mom – photography (Palomino)
Greg Allen – art direction, design
Ryan Hedgecock – album assembly, album sequencing, liner notes 
Produced for release by Greg Allen and Cheryl Pawelski
Project assistance by Audrey Bilger, Dutch Cramblitt, Lee Lodyga and Brad Rosenberger

References

2019 live albums
Lone Justice albums
Omnivore Recordings albums